Giuseppe Antonio Petrini (October 23, 1677- c. 1755–9) was a painter of the late-Baroque, active mainly in Lugano, present-day Switzerland.

While born in Carona in Canton Ticino and died in Lugano, both in Switzerland, Petrini belongs to the Northern Italian or Lombard heritage of baroque painting. He possibly apprenticed with Bartolomeo Guidobono after 1700. While some works can be found in Como and Bergamo, most are located in Lugano and the surrounding area. He is also listed between 1711 and 1753 as fabbriciere of the church of Madonna d’Onegro in Carona. He often painted "portraits" of historical figures including saints, philosophers, and scientists for patrons. One of his more prominent examples is his depiction of an auster St. Peter emerging from the shadows to pinpoint some lines in the gospel. He painted another St. Peter for the parish church of Dubino. Pietro Ligari classified him among the speculative painters, since these portraits, by nature, were imagined.

Sources
 Grove Art Encyclopedia biography
Settecento Lombardo. Milan, Palazzo Reale,  Giovanna Perini. The Burlington Magazine (1991); p340.

1677 births
1750s deaths
Year of death unknown
17th-century Swiss painters
18th-century Swiss painters
18th-century Swiss male artists
People from Lugano
Swiss male painters
Baroque painters
Italian Baroque painters
Swiss people of Italian descent